Treaty of San Ildefonso may refer to:

 First Treaty of San Ildefonso of 1777 between Spain and Portugal
 Second  Treaty of San Ildefonso of 1796 between Spain and France, allying the two nations
 Third Treaty of San Ildefonso of 1800 between Spain and France, by which Spain returned Louisiana to France

See also 
 San Ildefonso, a town in central Spain
 Royal Palace of La Granja de San Ildefonso, the summer residence of the Kings of Spain